The 2000 Hull City Council election took place on 4 May 2000 to elect members of Hull City Council in England. One third of the council was up for election and the Labour Party kept overall control of the council.

For the election the period in which voters were able to vote was extended to 3 days from the normal one day in an effort to increase turnout.

After the election, the composition of the council was:
Labour 44
Liberal Democrat 10
Independent 4
Conservative 2

Election result

References

2000
2000 English local elections
2000s in Kingston upon Hull